John Francis Egan (January 31, 1939 – July 21, 2022) was an American professional basketball player and coach. He played for the Detroit Pistons, New York Knicks, Baltimore Bullets, Los Angeles Lakers, Cleveland Cavaliers, and San Diego / Houston Rockets of the National Basketball Association from 1961 to 1972. He coached the Rockets from 1973 to 1976.

Early life and playing career 
Egan was born on January 31, 1939, in Hartford, Connecticut.  Playing for the basketball team at Weaver High School, which won the New England high school basketball championship in 1956 and 1957, he was named to the Parade All-America Boys Basketball Team.  He was known as "Space", a nickname which alluded to "his ability to stay in the air during drives to the basket or to the length of his long-distance shots". Egan attended Providence College, where he played college basketball for the Providence Friars, and won the 1961 National Invitation Tournament.

The Detroit Pistons of the National Basketball Association (NBA) selected Egan in the second round of the 1961 NBA draft. The New York Knicks acquired Egan from the Pistons in a three-team trade on December 16, 1963. The Knicks traded Egan, Johnny Green, and Jim "Bad News" Barnes to the Baltimore Bullets for Walt Bellamy on November 2, 1965. The Milwaukee Bucks selected Egan from the Bullets in the 1968 NBA Expansion Draft. Before the 1968–69 NBA season, the Bucks traded Egan to the Los Angeles Lakers for a future draft pick. He became a key rotation player for the Lakers, who reached the 1969 NBA Finals but were beaten by the Boston Celtics in Game 7. Egan was not as effective in the following season, as the Lakers again reached the Finals but were beaten by the Knicks in Game 7.

The Cleveland Cavaliers selected Egan in the 1970 NBA expansion draft. He was acquired by the San Diego Rockets from the Cavaliers for a third‐round pick in the 1971 NBA draft (41st overall–Jackie Ridgle) and cash on December 8, 1970. Egan became one of the original Houston Rockets when the team left San Diego in 1971. His playing career ended after the 1971–72 season. He averaged 7.8 points per game and 3.0 assists per game in his NBA career. He was the shortest player in the NBA for most of his 11-year career.

Coaching career
In January 1972, Rockets coach Tex Winter named Egan an assistant coach, and he continued as a player-coach for the remainder of the season. He retired as a player after the season, and was promoted to become head coach, succeeding Winter on January 21, 1973. At one point, he was the youngest and shortest coach in the NBA. During his  years as head coach, the Rockets were 129–152, with one playoff appearance in 1975, when they defeated the New York Knicks in the first round to earn the franchise's first playoff series win. He was fired and replaced by Tom Nissalke on April 20, 1976, after the team failed to qualify for the postseason with a 40–42 record.

Personal life 
Egan married Joan, his high school sweetheart. They had two children and five grandchildren. Joan died in 1998 from ovarian cancer.

After his basketball career, Egan remained in Houston, where he founded and operated an insurance business. He continued to live in Houston in his later life. After suffering a head injury in a fall in May 2022, he died on July 21, 2022, at age 83.

Head coaching record 

|-
| style="text-align:left;" | Houston
| style="text-align:left;" | 
| 35||16||19|||| style="text-align:center;" | 3rd in Central||–||–||–||–
| style="text-align:center;" | Missed playoffs
|-
| style="text-align:left;" | Houston
| style="text-align:left;" | 
| 82||32||50|||| style="text-align:center;" | 3rd in Central||–||–||–||–
| style="text-align:center;" | Missed playoffs
|-
| style="text-align:left;" | Houston
| style="text-align:left;" | 
| 82||41||41|||| style="text-align:center;" | 2nd in Central||8||3||5||
| style="text-align:center;" | Lost in Conf. Semi-finals
|-
| style="text-align:left;" | Houston
| style="text-align:left;" | 
| 82||40||42|||| style="text-align:center;" | 3rd in Central||–||–||–||–
| style="text-align:center;" | Missed playoffs
|- class="sortbottom"
| colspan="2" style="text-align:center;"| Career
| 281||129||152|||| ||8||3||5||
|- class="sortbottom"
| colspan="12" style="text-align: center;" | Source:

References

External links 
 Career stats

1939 births
2022 deaths
American men's basketball coaches
American men's basketball players
Baltimore Bullets (1963–1973) players
Basketball coaches from Connecticut
Basketball players from Hartford, Connecticut
Cleveland Cavaliers expansion draft picks
Detroit Pistons draft picks
Detroit Pistons players
Houston Rockets head coaches
Houston Rockets players
Los Angeles Lakers players
Milwaukee Bucks expansion draft picks
New York Knicks players
Parade High School All-Americans (boys' basketball)
Point guards
Providence Friars men's basketball players
San Diego Rockets players
Sportspeople from Hartford, Connecticut